Fasnia is a town and a municipality in the eastern part of the Spanish island of Tenerife, one of the Canary Islands, and part of the province of Santa Cruz de Tenerife. Its population is 2,873 (2013). The TF-1 motorway passes through the municipality.

Etymology
The name of the municipality comes from that of its administrative capital, being a term of Guanche origin that also appears in the historical documentation with the Fasnea variant.

As for its possible meaning, the historian Dominik Josef Wölfel relates it to the Berber word tafessena / tifesseniwin, 'step, rung of a ladder', an opinion that is also accepted by the philologist and historian Ignacio Reyes.</ref> opinión que también acepta el filólogo e historiador Ignacio Reyes.

Sites of interest
Barranco de Fasnia y Güimar, a river gorge, and a natural monument.

References 

Municipalities in Tenerife